The 2012 Men's Hockey Düsseldorf Masters was the seventeenth edition of the Hamburg Masters, consisting of a series of test matches. It was held in Düsseldorf, Germany, from 21 to 24 June 2012, and featured four of the top nations in men's field hockey.

Competition format
The tournament featured the national teams of Belgium, the Netherlands, Spain, and the hosts, Germany, competing in a round-robin format, with each team playing each other once. Three points were awarded for a win, one for a draw, and none for a loss.

Officials
The following umpires were appointed by the International Hockey Federation to officiate the tournament:

 Christian Bläsch (GER)
 Roel van Eert (NED)
 Colin Hutchinson (IRE)
 Eduardo Lizana (ESP)
 Gregory Uyttenhove (BEL)

Results
All times are local (Central European Summer Time).

Pool

Fixtures

Statistics

Final standings

Goalscorers

References

External links
Deutscher Hockey-Bund 

2012
Men's
2012 in Belgian sport
2012 in Spanish sport
2012 in Dutch sport
2012 in German sport
Sport in Düsseldorf
June 2012 sports events in Germany